Isaac of Chernigov was a Russian-Jewish scholar of the twelfth century, frequently consulted by his contemporaries on questions of Biblical exegesis. He is probably identical with Isaac of Russia, found in the English records of 1181. His explanation of the term "yabam," for which he finds a parallel in the Russian language, is quoted by Moses ben Isaac ha-Nessiah of London in his lexicon Sefer ha-Shoham. Leopold Zunz, and after him Abraham Harkavy, see in this explanation evidence that the Jews living in Russia in the time of Isaac of Chernigov spoke the vernacular of the country.

Bibliography
 Zunz, Ritus, p. 73;
 Harkavy, Ha-Yehudim u-Sefat ha-Selavim, pp. 14, 62;
 Neubauer, in Allg. Zeit. des Jud. 1865, No. 17;
 Jacobs, Jews of Angevin England, pp. 66, 73;
 J. Q. R. ii. 329.

References

12th-century Rus' rabbis
Year of birth missing
Year of death missing
People from Chernihiv